Yaseen Akhtar Misbahi (Born: 12-02-1953, Khalispur, Adari, Mau, U.P., India), is Sunni Sufi Islamic scholar associated with the Ahle Sunnat Barelvi organisation Raza Academy. He is also member of All India Muslim Personal Law Board and runs the prestigious Darul Qalam Madrassa. He founded the Qadri Mosque in Zakir Nagar locality of New Delhi and was an Urdu journalist in the past who edited monthly Kanzul Iman magazine from Delhi. In 1985 during Shah Bano case, he was elected vice president of prestigious All India Muslim Personal Law Board and propagated for the protection for Shariat. He led the community in various political and social demonstration to safeguard the rights of Indian Muslims.

Works
Misbahi is a prolific writer of books on various Islamic and Muslim issues of India. The following is a list of some of his works.
Some Prominent Ulama and their Role in 1857  
Urdu book ’24 Ayat Ka Qurani Mafhoom’ (The Real Meaning of 24 verses of Quran related to Jihad) 
RSS Ke Agende (Agendas of RSS) 
Al-Madih-un-Nabvi (Arabic) Praise of Holy Prophet
Danish Ki Nazar Mein
Khak e Hijaz			 		 	
Gunbad-e-Khizra (The Green Dome)		 
Imam Ahmad Raza Ki Fiqhi Basirat (Jurisprudential vision of Imam Ahmed Raza)	 		 
Imam Ahmad Raza Ki Muhaddthana Azmat	(Greatness of Imam Ahmed Raza as a Muhadith) 	 		 
Islahe Fikro Aitiqad	 		 		 	
Jashn-e-Milad-un-Nabi	 (Celebration of The Birth of The Holy Prophet)		 		 	
Mooe Mubarak (Blessed Hair (of the prophet))	 		 		 
Muarife Kanzul Iman	 		 		 	
Muslim Personal Law Ka Thaffuz	 (Protection of Muslim Personal Law)		 		 
Paigham-e-Amal (Message of Practice)			 
Radde Bidat-o-Monkirat(Imam Raza) (Rejection of innovation and the forbidden)	 	 		 	
Sawad-e-Azam	 		 	 	
Sharihe Bukhari	 		 		 	
Taarufe Ahl-e-Sunnat (Introduction of Ahle Sunnat Wal Jamaat)	 
Taarufe Al Jamtul Ashrafia

Views on terrorism and extremism
He is of the view that, Al-Qaeda and ISIS are perpetrating atrocities, brazenly violating Islam in the name of Islam, Jihad and Khilafat. In a National seminar organised to condemn terrorism in New Delhi, Maulana Misbahi averred that the conference was planned to strongly, unambiguously and unequivocally declare all such pernicious and obnoxious acts as mindless violence of the extremists. "We also proclaim that they have nothing to do with the peace-loving and pluralistic Indian Muslims who are vehemently opposed to the handful terrorist goons".

Views about country
He said that "Indian Muslims are against every form of terror whether physical or theoretical." He also appealed to Muslims to take pride in being ‘Indians’ just as they feel proud to be Muslims. He said that Muslims in India are living in a safe haven as compared to many countries where Muslims constitute the majority.

Detention and release by Delhi Police
On 23 July 2015, Delhi Police special cell called him to Okhla Jamia Nagar police station and questioned him at another location, Zakir Nagar residents, led by local politicians, gathered in protest outside Jamia Nagar police station. His detention was protested by local residents of the area and later Police released him with respect and apologised for the same.

Welfare Party of India, national secretary, Dr SQR Ilyas said that Maulana devoted  his life in religious scholastic and investigative tasks to serve the religion. He has been a part of several religious institutions and also an important member of the All India Muslim Personal Law Board. His detention by Delhi Police is totally biased and regrettable.

Views on Darul Qaza
Yaseen Akhtar Misbahi told that Sharia courts were very running for years. "If they help in solving the problems related to a particular community, no one should object."

See also
Ahmed Raza Khan Barelvi
Arshadul Qaudri
Ahmad Saeed Kazmi
Hamid Raza Khan
Obaidullah Khan Azmi

References

External links
A Brief Introduction to Ahle-Sunna Wal Jamaat authored by Allama Yaseen Akhtar Misbahi

Indian Sunni Muslim scholars of Islam
Barelvis
Living people
Year of birth missing (living people)